The Veterinarian's Oath was adopted by the American Veterinary Medical Association's House of Delegates July 1969, and amended by the AVMA Executive Board, November 1999 and December 2010. 

The Veterinarian Oath taken by Canadian veterinarians, established by the Canadian Veterinary Medical Association in 2004, has some minor deviations from that of the American Veterinary Medical Association. It reads as follows:

See also

Veterinary ethics

References

External links
 http://www.avma.org American Veterinary Medical Association
 http://www.rcvs.org.uk Royal College Veterinary Surgeons
 http://www.canadianveterinarians.net Canadian Veterinary Medical Association 

Oaths of medicine
Veterinary medicine